Ignacio Larrague (born 25 October 1995) is an Argentine rugby union player who plays as a lock.

Super Rugby

Larrague was a member of the Jaguares squad which competed in Super Rugby for the first time during the 2016 Super Rugby season.   He made two appearances for them in their debut campaign in the competition.

International career

Larrague was selected in the Argentina Under-20 sides which competed in the World Championships in 2014 and 2015.

Super Rugby Statistics

References

1995 births
Living people
Argentine rugby union players
Rugby union locks
Jaguares (Super Rugby) players
Club Atlético San Isidro rugby union players
Rugby union players from Buenos Aires
Argentina international rugby union players